Rafael Esguerra García (1922-2000) was the principal architect and co-founder of Colombian architecture firm Esguerra Saenz Urdaneta Samper (ESUS) in 1946.  He graduated in 1945 from the National Colombian University (Universidad Nacional de Colombia) in Architecture and Civil Engineering. In ESUS he was in charge of the Structural department. He was also in the Board of subsidiary companies of ESUS such as Estruco & Cia. Ltda, a company specialized in concrete structures and civil engineering established in 1953. He partnered with engineer Doménico Parma and created the firm Ingeniería Mecánica Colombiana (IMC) in 1963 to design and produce heavy machinery for building processes, structural cabling and post-tensioning technologies.  His work includes Avianca headquarters Tower in 1968, the Centro Urbano Antonio Nariño (Antonio Nariño Urban Center) in 1952, and notably the Concrete dome of the Periodicals Archive Hall (Hemeroteca) of the Biblioteca Luis Ángel Arango (Luis Ángel Arango Library). He was also involved in the design and construction of the Banco Central Hipotecario (BCH) building (Central Mortgage Bank) and the Ciudadela Colsubsidio. He founded the Aeroclub de Colombia and logged 15,000 hours of flight.

Works

See also
Colombian architecture

References

Colombian architects
Year of birth missing (living people)
Living people